Franklin Chacón Orozco (born 18 June 1985) is a Costa Rican footballer who currently plays for Puntarenas.

Career
Chacón began his career in the youth ranks of Herediano before moving to the United States to join Seattle Sounders on a year-long loan.  During his stint there, he made 12 appearances and recorded his only point of the year on June 4, 2005 in a 2-1 away win over Virginia Beach Mariners.  Picking up an assist on the second goal of the match by Roger Levesque.  Seattle went on to win the 2005 USL First Division title.

In December 2008, he was out of contract and released by Herediano.

Honours

Seattle Sounders
 USL First Division Championship (1): 2005

References

1985 births
Living people
Association football midfielders
Costa Rican footballers
C.S. Herediano footballers
Seattle Sounders (1994–2008) players
Puntarenas F.C. players
A.D. Carmelita footballers
Costa Rican expatriate footballers
Expatriate soccer players in the United States
USL First Division players